The Legion of Doom (LOD) was a hacker group founded by the hacker Lex Luthor (Raavan) after a rift with his previous group called the Knights of Shadow. LOD was active from the 1980s to the early 2000s, but was most active from 1984–1991 and at the time was considered to be the most capable hacking group in the world.  Today, Legion of Doom ranks as one of the more influential hacking groups in the history of technology, appearing to be a reference to the antagonists of Challenge of the Super Friends.

At different points in the group's history, LOD was split into LOD and LOD/LOH (Legion of Doom/Legion of Hackers) for the members that were more skilled at hacking than pure phreaking.

There was a second hacking group at the time, called MOD, short for the Masters of Deception. The overall beliefs of LOD and MOD were different, but it can be difficult to untangle the actions of the members since there was a cross-over between the two groups. Unlike the hacking group MOD, there were different opinions regarding what the Legion of Doom was. LOD published the Legion of Doom Technical Journals and contributed to the overall pool of hacking knowledge. They were not causing any direct harm to the phone systems and computer networks they took over. Still, at the time, any tampering with the phone systems was considered damaging, and many LOD members were raided and prosecuted for causing alleged damage to systems (Grant, Darden and Riggs, etc.).

History
During the summer of 1984, a year after the movie WarGames was released, an idea was formulated that would ultimately change the face of the computer underground forever.  This particular summer, a huge surge of interest in computer telecommunications placed an incredibly large number of new enthusiasts on the national computer scene. This crowd of people all seeking to learn as much as possible began to put a strain on the bulletin board (FIDO) scene, as the novices stormed the phonelines in search of knowledge.  From out of this chaos came a need for knowledgeable instructors to teach information to the new users.

In 1984, one of the most popular bulletin boards of the day was a system in New York state called Plover-NET, which was run by a person who called himself Quasi-Moto.  This BBS was so heavily trafficked that a major long-distance company began blocking all calls to its number (516-935-2481). The co-sysop of Plover-NET was a person known as Lex Luthor.  At the time there were a few hacking groups in existence, such as Fargo 4A and Knights of Shadow, but the Legion of Doom was considered the most technically adept. Lex joined KOS in early 1984, but after a few suggestions about new members were rejected, Lex decided to put up an invitation-only BBS and form a new group. Lex contacted those people who he had seen on BBSes such as Plover-NET and the people that he knew personally who possessed the necessary knowledge that the group he envisioned should have, starting around May 1984.  After a number of Alliance Teleconferences, Lex Luthor, Karl Marx, Mark Tabas, Agrajag the Prolonged, King Blotto, Blue Archer, EBA, The Dragyn, and Unknown Soldier became the original Legion of Doom members.

Members of LOD

As of 2012 what has happened to each individual member of the Legion of Doom is unknown. A small handful of the higher-profile LOD members who are accounted for includes: "Lex Luthor", "Erik Bloodaxe", "Mark Tabas", "Karl Marx", "Agrajag the Prolonged", "Automatic Jack", "Bill From RNOC", "Lord Digital", "The Mentor", "Doctor Who", "Dead Lord", "Phiber Optik", who was a member of both LOD and Masters of Deception (MOD), and "Terminus".

Internal and external battles of LOD 
LOD was against wanton destruction of computers which had been hacked. Gary Cohen "Terminal Man" was dismissed from the group for this reason. Other disagreements led to bad blood between Erik Bloodaxe and Mark Tabas. A war with MOD was undertaken, and Erik Bloodaxe led as LOD's general. While Bloodaxe was active in this regard, other LOD members were less so.

Projects of LOD 
In 1992, several members of LOD came together and founded LODCOM, Inc., which collected old hacker bulletin board messages for an archive, which was to be sold. Most, if not all, of this material later ended up on textfiles.com. Marauder formed LOD.COM as a consulting company, and several ex-LOD members had accounts on the system. In the late 1990s, a root DNS server had an illicit new TLD of .LOD for over a year.  The business name "LOD Communications" arose sometime in the late 80s when Frank Carson (aka Basketball Jones - one of the few "Unknown to the public" LOD Members) registered the name & applied for a CT Tax ID to enable Marauder to get on the Bellcore technical document mailing list.

See also 
Great Hacker War
The Hacker Crackdown
Masters of Deception

References

Public access legal records and transcripts
US Government's Sentencing Memorandum, US v. Grant, Darden and Riggs, Criminal Action Number 1:90-CR-31, December 1990. (US Government v. "Legion of Doom")
LOD Technical Manuals and source
The Legion of Doom/Hackers Technical Journal

 
Defunct computer magazines published in the United States
Hacker magazines
Hacker groups